Proto-Mongolic is the hypothetical ancestor language of the modern Mongolic languages. It is very close to the Middle Mongol language, the language spoken at the time of Genghis Khan and the Mongol Empire. Most features of modern Mongolic languages can thus be shown to descend from Middle Mongol. An exception would be the Common Mongolic pluritative voice suffix -cAgA- 'do together', which can be reconstructed from the modern languages but is not attested in Middle Mongol.

Regarding the time period when Proto-Mongolic was spoken, Juha Janhunen writes: "The absolute dating of Proto-Mongolic depends on when, exactly, the linguistic unity of its speakers ended", that is, when it evolved into separate Mongolic languages; this event took place "only after the geographical dispersal of the ancient Mongols under Chinggis Khan", which was "not earlier than the thirteenth century." As a result, "[t]his means that the present-day differences between the Mongolic languages are likely to be the result of less than 800 years of divergent evolution."

Phonology

Morphology

Plurals 
One way in which Proto-Mongolic formed plurals was by adding -s or -ud to a word. -s would be added to words ending in vowels, for example ere (man) would become eres. -ud would be added to words ending in consonants, for example nom (book) would become nomud. However, for words ending with the consonant n, l, or r would lose the final letter, and just add d, for example kan (prince) would become kad (princes).

Lexicon

Notes

References

 

Agglutinative languages
Mongolic languages
Proto-languages